Alto is an unincorporated community in Bowne Township, Kent County, in the U.S. state of Michigan.

Geography 
Alto is situated on Pratt Lake Creek, at the intersection of Bancroft Avenue and 60th Street, just west of M-50, about two miles south of exit 52 off I-96.

The Alto ZIP code 49302 serves most of Bowne Township as well as portions of Lowell Township to the north, Cascade Township to the northwest, and Caledonia Township to the west. It also serves a very small area of Campbell Township in Ionia County around the community of Elmdale.

History
Alto was founded by David N. Skidmore in 1845. A post office was established in September 1851, with Daniel C McVean as the first postmaster. Alto was also a station on the Detroit, Grand Rapids and Western Railroad. It was named by Lucy Skidmore McVean for being the highest point of land along the railroad between Grand Rapids and Detroit.
The annual Alto Harvest Festival is held in September of each year. This tradition started in 1970.

Education
Lowell and Caledonia Area Schools operates area public schools. Alto and Caledonia Elementary Schools serves Alto, while Lowell and Caledonia Middle School and Lowell High School serve the entire district.

See also
 Kent District Library

References 

Unincorporated communities in Kent County, Michigan
Grand Rapids metropolitan area
Populated places established in 1845
Unincorporated communities in Michigan